Acer platanoides, commonly known as the Norway maple, is a species of maple native to eastern and central Europe and western Asia, from Spain east to Russia, north to southern Scandinavia and southeast to northern Iran. It was introduced to North America in the mid-1700s as a shade tree. It is a member of the family Sapindaceae.

Description 
The bark is grey-brown and shallowly grooved. Unlike many other maples, mature trees do not tend to develop a shaggy bark. The shoots are green at first, soon becoming pale brown. The winter buds are shiny red-brown.

The autumn colour is usually yellow, occasionally orange-red.

It typically produces a large quantity of viable seeds.

Under ideal conditions in its native range, Norway maple may live up to 250 years, but often has a much shorter life expectancy; in North America, for example, sometimes only 60 years. Especially when used on streets, it can have insufficient space for its root network and is prone to the roots wrapping around themselves, girdling and killing the tree. In addition, their roots tend to be quite shallow and thereby they easily out-compete nearby plants for nutrient uptake. Norway maples often cause significant damage and cleanup costs for municipalities and homeowners when branches break off in storms as it does not have strong wood.

Classification and identification 

The Norway maple is a member (and is the type species) of the section Platanoidea Pax, characterised by flattened, disc-shaped seeds and the shoots and leaves containing milky sap. Other related species in this section include Acer campestre (field maple), Acer cappadocicum (Cappadocian maple), Acer lobelii (Lobel's maple), and Acer truncatum (Shandong maple). From the field maple, the Norway maple is distinguished by its larger leaves with pointed, not blunt, lobes, and from the other species by the presence of one or more teeth on all of the lobes.

It is also frequently confused with the more distantly related Acer saccharum (sugar maple). The sugar maple is easy to differentiate by clear sap in the petiole (leaf stem); Norway maple petioles have white sap. The tips of the points on Norway maple leaves reduce to a fine "hair", while the tips of the points on sugar maple leaves are, on close inspection, rounded. On mature trees, sugar maple bark is more shaggy, while Norway maple bark has small, often criss-crossing grooves. While the shape and angle of leaf lobes vary somewhat within all maple species, the leaf lobes of Norway maple tend to have a more triangular (acuminate) shape, in contrast to the more finely toothed lobes of sugar maples, that narrow towards the base. Flowering and seed production begins at ten years of age, however large quantities of seeds are not produced until the tree is 20. As with most maples, Norway maple is normally dioecious (separate male and female trees), occasionally monoecious, and trees may change gender from year to year.

The fruits of Norway maple are paired samaras with widely diverging wings, distinguishing them from those of sycamore, Acer pseudoplatanus which are at 90 degrees to each other. Norway maple seeds are flattened, while those of sugar maple are globose. The sugar maple usually has a brighter orange autumn color, where the Norway maple is usually yellow, although some of the red-leaved cultivars appear more orange.

The flowers emerge in spring before the leaves and last 2-3 weeks. Leafout of Norway maple occurs roughly when air temperatures reach 55°F (12°C) and there is at least 13 hours of daylight. Leaf drop in autumn is initiated when day lengths fall to approximately 10 hours. Depending on the latitude, leaf drop may vary by as much as three weeks, beginning in the second week of October in Scandinavia and the first week of November in southern Europe. Norway maple does not require freezing temperatures for proper growth, however it is adapted to higher latitudes with long summer days and does not perform well when planted south of the 37th parallel, the approximate southern limit of its range in Europe. Further, most North American Norway maples are believed descended from stock brought from Germany, at approximately 48N to 54N, not the more southerly ecotypes found in Italy and the Balkans that evolved for similar lighting conditions as the continental United States. The heavy seed crop and high germination rate contributes to its invasiveness in North America, where it forms dense monotypic stands that choke out native vegetation. The tree is also capable of growing in low lighting conditions within a forest canopy, leafs out earlier than most North American maple species, and its growing season tends to run longer as the lighting conditions of the United States (see above) result in fall dormancy occurring later than it does in the higher latitude of Europe. It is one of the few introduced species that can successfully invade and colonize a virgin forest. By comparison, in its native range, Norway maple is rarely a dominant species and instead occurs mostly as a scattered understory tree.

Cultivation and uses 

The wood is hard, yellowish-white to pale reddish, with the heartwood not distinct; it is used for furniture and woodturning. The wood is rated as non-durable to perishable in regard to decay resistance. In Europe, it is used for furniture, flooring and musical instruments. This species as grown in the former Yugoslavia is also called Bosnian maple, and is probably the maple used by the famous Italian violin makers, Stradivari and Guarneri.

Norway maple has been widely taken into cultivation in other areas, including western Europe northwest of its native range. It grows north of the Arctic Circle at Tromsø, Norway. In North America, it is planted as a street and shade tree as far north as Anchorage, Alaska. In Ontario, it is common in cultivation north to Sault Ste. Marie and Sudbury; although not considered reliably hardy northward, it has been established at Kapuskasing and Iroquois Falls, and even at Moose Factory. It is most recommended in USDA Hardiness Zones 4 to 7 but will grow in warmer zones (at least up to Zone 10) where summer heat is moderate, as along the Pacific coast south to the Los Angeles basin. They tend to prefer wetter Oceanic climates.  During the 1950s–60s it became popular as a street tree due to the large-scale loss of American elms from Dutch elm disease.

It is favored due to its tall trunk and tolerance of poor, compacted soils and urban pollution, conditions in which the sugar maple has difficulty. It has become a popular species for bonsai in Europe, and is used for medium to large bonsai sizes and a multitude of styles. Norway maples are not typically cultivated for maple syrup production due to the lower sugar content of the sap compared to sugar maple.

Cultivars 
Many cultivars have been selected for distinctive leaf shapes or colorations, such as the dark purple of 'Crimson King' and 'Schwedleri', the variegated leaves of 'Drummondii', the light green of 'Emerald Queen', and the deeply divided, feathery leaves of 'Dissectum' and 'Lorbergii'. The purple-foliage cultivars have orange to red autumn colour. 'Columnare' is selected for its narrow upright growth. The cultivars 'Crimson King'  and 'Prigold' have gained the Royal Horticultural Society's Award of Garden Merit.

As an invasive species in North America 
The Norway maple was introduced to northeastern North America between 1750 and 1760 as an ornamental shade tree. It was brought to the Pacific Northwest in the 1870s. Today, Norway maples tend to be most common in the Pacific Northwest, in southern Ontario, and along the Kennebec river in southern Maine. The roots of Norway maples grow very close to the ground surface, starving other plants of moisture. For example, lawn grass (and even weeds) will usually not grow well beneath a Norway maple, but English Ivy, with its minimal rooting needs, may thrive. In addition, the dense canopy of Norway maples can inhibit understory growth. Some have suggested Norway maples may also release chemicals to discourage undergrowth, although this claim is controversial. A. platanoides has been shown to inhibit the growth of native saplings as a canopy tree or as a sapling. The Norway maple also suffers less herbivory than the sugar maple, allowing it to gain a competitive advantage against the latter species. As a result of these characteristics, it is considered invasive in some states, and has been banned for sale in New Hampshire and Massachusetts. The state of New York has classified it as an invasive plant species. Despite these steps, the species is still available and widely used for urban plantings in many areas.

Education about the invasive nature of the tree is expanding thanks to organizations like the National Audubon Society.

Natural enemies 
The larvae of a number of species of Lepidoptera feed on Norway maple foliage. Ectoedemia sericopeza, the Norway maple seedminer, is a moth of the family Nepticulidae. The larvae emerge from eggs laid on the samara and tunnel to the seeds. Norway maple is generally free of serious diseases, though can be attacked by the powdery mildew Uncinula bicornis, and verticillium wilt disease caused by Verticillium spp. "Tar spots" caused by Rhytisma acerinum infection are common but largely harmless. Aceria pseudoplatani is an acarine mite that causes a 'felt gall', found on the underside of leaves of both sycamore maple (Acer pseudoplatanus) and Norway maples.

References

External links 

 Acer platanoides - information, genetic conservation units and related resources. European Forest Genetic Resources Programme (EUFORGEN) 
 Portrait of the Earth: Acer platanoides (Norway maple) — with winter images.

platanoides
Trees of Asia
Trees of Europe
Flora of Western Asia
Trees of humid continental climate
Plants described in 1753
Taxa named by Carl Linnaeus